The following table shows most of the attractions found in all of the Walt Disney Parks and Resorts around the world.

Key:

A – C

D – F

G – I

J – L

M – O

P – S

T – Z

See also
List of Disney attractions using Audio-Animatronics
List of lands at Disney theme parks
List of Disney attractions that were never built
Rail transport in Walt Disney Parks and Resorts

References

 
Theme park attractions